The 2011–12 Creighton Bluejays men's basketball team represented Creighton University during the 2011–12 NCAA Division I men's basketball season. The Bluejays, led by second year head coach Greg McDermott, played their home games at the CenturyLink Center Omaha (renamed from Qwest Center Omaha in the 2011 offseason) and are members of the Missouri Valley Conference. The conference season ended with 14–4 record, finishing in 2nd place, behind Wichita State. They finished the season 29–6, 14–4 in MVC play to finish in second place. They were champions of the Missouri Valley Basketball tournament to earn the conference's automatic bid into the 2012 NCAA tournament where they defeated Alabama in the first round before falling in the second round to North Carolina.

Offseason

Departures

2011 recruiting class

Roster

Rankings

Schedule
 
|-
!colspan=9| Exhibition

|-
!colspan=9| Regular season

|-
!colspan=9| Missouri Valley Conference Basketball tournament

|-
!colspan=9| 2012 NCAA tournament

References

Creighton
Creighton Bluejays men's basketball seasons
Creighton
Blue
Blue